Magic Hour is the fourth studio album by American band Scissor Sisters, released on May 25, 2012, by Polydor Records. The first single from the album was initially "Shady Love" but was later replaced by "Only the Horses", co-produced by recording artist and DJ Calvin Harris, which entered and peaked at number 12 on the UK Singles Chart.

Background

Lead singer Jake Shears tweeted on October 31, 2011, that the album was almost finished. A song from the new album titled "Shady Love" debuted on Annie Mac's BBC Radio 1 show on January 2, 2012, which features guest vocals from Azealia Banks and Jake Shears under his pseudonym Krystal Pepsy.

Shears said the new record is "a sweet joyful mélange of beat-driven future-pop. It style-hops all over the place unabashedly." For the record, the band worked with a diverse list of collaborators, including Calvin Harris, Pharrell Williams, Diplo, Alex Ridha and Azealia Banks.

The album was recorded over the previous year in both New York and London. On March 13, 2012, Scissor Sisters announced the title of their fourth album and announced that the album would be released on May 28, 2012, in the UK and May 29, 2012, in the US. The first single, "Only the Horses", was officially released on May 13, 2012.

Shears revealed in the bonus DVD that the song "The Secret Life of Letters" is the only song that was not newly written for the album. In some countries, "Fuck Yeah" is included as a bonus track together with two other remixes of the album tracks.

The Scissor Sisters are also credited with popularising the slang term Kiki, with its previous use limited to and created in the 1990 documentary film Paris Is Burning.

Release and promotion
Upon revealing the album's title and release date, the band also announced several concerts to promote the release. The band scheduled one show at the Bowery Ballroom in New York on May 6, 2012, and two concerts at London's O2 Shepherd's Bush Empire on May 16 and May 17, 2012, to coincide with the album release. The shows allowed the band to debut the new material in a live setting, a week before the record's official release. Fans were also given an exclusive pre-sale to get early tickets via the band's website. On May 23, two days before the album's release, Scissor Sisters released an infomercial-style commercial starring Queens of the Stone Age's lead singer Joshua Homme on their YouTube channel.

Singles
On January 2, 2012, BBC Radio 1 premiered the song "Shady Love". It was set to be released as a single on February 12, 2012, but the release was cancelled for unknown reasons. Instead, "Only the Horses" was released as the album's lead single on April 13, 2012, with a remix EP released on May 13, 2012. On the week of May 8, 2012, the album went up for pre-order on the European iTunes Stores. As a pre-order bonus, "San Luis Obispo" was made available for purchase as a promotional single. Similarly, the track "Let's Have a Kiki" was also made available for streaming on Spotify. "Baby Come Home" was released as the second official single from the album on July 22, 2012. The music video for the song was released on May 30, 2012. "Let's Have a Kiki" was released as the third official single on September 11, 2012, in the US and September 18, 2012, in the UK. The single topped the Hot Dance Club Songs chart in the US, following the release of a viral video made for the song by Craig MacNeil of Videodrome Discothèque that increased exposure for the track. It was subsequently picked up for dance airplay in the US and saw the release of promotional CDs featuring remixes of the track.

Critical reception

Magic Hour received generally positive reviews from critics upon its release. At Metacritic, which assigns a normalized rating out of 100 to reviews from mainstream critics, the album received an average score of 67 based on 22 reviews, which indicates "generally favorable reviews".

Mixmag gave the album four out of five and said, "Smoky, slow-paced, disco soul with Bee Gees-style falsetto harmonising, it's the type of grown-up pop Scissor Sisters can pull off like few others." Similarly, Uncut gave it a score of four out of five stars and said that it was "full of melodies that feel effortless and instantly classic." musicOMH also gave it four stars out of five and said, "This is the sound of a band truly enjoying themselves in the studio, confident enough in their abilities to freely collaborate with other big names." Canadian newspaper Now gave the album three stars out of five and said, "The production sometimes eclipses the songwriting."

Some reviews were mixed or negative.  The Phoenix gave it two stars out of four and said that it "lives up to the promise of its hilarious, zebra-centric-2001: A Space Odyssey cover art. But the wheels fall off with 'Year of Living Dangerously,' a campy, aimless doodle not even rescued by its random violin solo." No Ripcord gave it three out of ten stars and called it not just "exactly bad", but "boring".

Commercial performance
The album debuted at number four on the UK Albums Chart with sales of 19,297 copies, behind Gary Barlow's Sing, Paloma Faith's Fall to Grace, and Rumer's Boys Don't Cry.

Track listing

Notes
  signifies a co-producer
  signifies an additional producer

Charts

Release history

References

2012 albums
Albums produced by Calvin Harris
Albums produced by Pharrell Williams
Albums produced by Stuart Price
Casablanca Records albums
Polydor Records albums
Scissor Sisters albums